David Lambie Black (15 September 1883 – 25 March 1974) was a Scottish professional golfer. He was runner-up in the 1911 Canadian Open. He is a member of the Canadian Golf Hall of Fame, as is his son Ken Black, who won a 1936 PGA Tour event. His older brother John was also a professional golfer.

Professional wins
Note: This list may be incomplete.

1913 Canadian PGA Championship
1919 Canadian PGA Championship
1920 Canadian PGA Championship, Northwest Open
1921 Canadian PGA Championship
1922 Northwest Open
1924 Washington Open
1928 British Columbia Open
1930 British Columbia Open

Results in major championships

Note: Black never played in the Masters Tournament or the PGA Championship.
DNP = Did not play
CUT = Missed the cut
"T" indicates a tie for a place

References

External links
Davie Black at the Canadian Golf Hall of Fame website

Scottish male golfers
Sportspeople from South Ayrshire
People from Troon
Golfing people from British Columbia
1883 births
1974 deaths